This article shows the roster of all participating teams at the 2017 FIVB Volleyball World League.

Group 1

The following is the Argentine roster in the 2017 World League.

Head coach: Julio Velasco

The following is the Belgian roster in the 2017 World League.

Head coach: Vital Heynen

The following is the Brazilian roster in the 2017 World League.

Head coach: Renan Dal Zotto

The following is the Bulgarian roster in the 2017 World League.

Head coach: Plamen Konstantinov

The following is the Canadian roster in the 2017 World League.

Head coach:  Stéphane Antiga

The following is the French roster in the 2017 World League.

Head coach: Laurent Tillie

The following is the Iranian roster in the 2017 World League.

Head coach:  Igor Kolaković

The following is the Italian roster in the 2017 World League.

Head coach: Gianlorenzo Blengini

The following is the Polish roster in the 2017 World League.

Head coach:  Ferdinando De Giorgi

The following is the Russian roster in the 2017 World League.

Head coach: Sergey Shlyapnikov

The following is the Serbian roster in the 2017 World League.

Head coach: Nikola Grbić

The following is the American roster in the 2017 World League.

Head coach: John Speraw

Group 2

The following is the Australian roster in the 2017 World League.

Head coach: Mark Lebedew

The following is the Chinese roster in the 2017 World League. Before the match begins, Miao Ruantong replaced Geng Xin at last.

Head coach:  Raúl Lozano

The following is the Czech roster in the 2017 World League.

Head coach:  Miguel Ángel Falasca

The following is the Egyptian roster in the 2017 World League.

Head coach: Ibrahim Fakhreldin

The following is the Finnish roster in the 2017 World League.

Head coach: Tuomas Sammelvuo

The following is the Japanese roster in the 2017 World League.

Head coach: Yuichi Nakagaichi

The following is the Dutch roster in the 2017 World League.

Head coach: Gido Vermeulen

The following is the Portuguese roster in the 2017 World League.

Head coach: Hugo Silva

The following is the Slovak roster in the 2017 World League.

Head coach: Andrej Kravarik

The following is the Slovenian roster in the 2017 World League.

Head coach:  Slobodan Kovač

The following is the Korean roster in the 2017 World League.

Head coach: Kim Ho-chul

The following is the Turkish roster in the 2017 World League.

Head coach:  Joško Milenkoski

Group 3

The following is the Austrian roster in the 2017 World League.

Head coach:  Michael Warm

The following is the Taiwanese roster in the 2017 World League.

Head coach: Yu Ching-fang

The following is the Estonian roster in the 2017 World League.

Head coach:  Gheorghe Creţu

The following is the German roster in the 2017 World League.

Head coach:  Andrea Giani

The following is the Greek roster in the 2017 World League.

Head coach: Konstantinos Arseniadis

The following is the Kazakhstani roster in the 2017 World League.

Head coach: Igor Nikolchenko

The following is the Mexican roster in the 2017 World League.

Head coach: Jorge Azair

The following is the Montenegrin roster in the 2017 World League.

Head coach:  Veljko Basić

The following is the Qatari roster in the 2017 World League.

Head coach:  Massimiliano Giaccardi

The following is the Spanish roster in the 2017 World League.

Head coach: Fernando Muñoz

The following is the Tunisian roster in the 2017 World League.

Head coach:  Antonio Giacobbe

The following is the Venezuelan roster in the 2017 World League.

Head coach: Ronald Sarti

References

External links
Official website

2017
2017 in men's volleyball